Shaddād, also known as Shaddād bin ʽĀd, was believed to be the king of the lost Arabian city of Iram of the Pillars, an account of which is mentioned in Sura 89 of the Qur'an. Various sources suggest Shaddad was the son of 'Ad al-Miltat ibn Saksak ibn Wa'il ibn Himyar.

His story is found in the 277th through 279th nights of the Tales of the Arabian Nights (The Book of One Thousand and One Nights) the tale described him as a universal king who ruled over the world and the one who built the city of gold.

Brothers Shadīd and Shaddād are said to have reigned in turn over the 1,000 Adite tribes, each consisting of several thousand men. It is said Shaddad brutally subdued all Arabia and Iraq. Many Arab writers tell of an expedition of Shaddād that caused the Canaanite migration, their settling in Syria, and the Shepherd invasion of Egypt.

According to the Quran, Iram of the Pillars was a city of occult worshippers of stone idols, who defied the warnings of the prophet Hud. To punish them, God sent a drought. But the people would not repent, so they were destroyed by a furious wind, from which only Hud and a few believers emerged.

References

External links
  Iram Negeri Kaum Aad yang Dibinasakan in KisahMuslim.com

One Thousand and One Nights characters
Mythological kings
Arabian mythology